Denver Burton Mills (August 29, 1925 – November 4, 1997) was a professional American football player for the National Football League's Chicago Cardinals. He played in just one game in the 1952 season after his collegiate career at William & Mary.

References

1925 births
1997 deaths
American football linebackers
Chicago Cardinals players
William & Mary Tribe football players
People from Wythe County, Virginia
Players of American football from Richmond, Virginia